Javier Prieto may refer to:

 Javier Prieto (boxer) (born 1987), Mexican boxer
 Javier Prieto (sailor) (born 1949), Mexican sailor